Who Is the Sender? is the fifth studio album by English singer, pianist and songwriter Bill Fay, released by Dead Oceans in April 2015 by Dead Oceans. The second album track, "War Machine", was released in February 2015. The closing track, "I Hear You Calling (Studio Reunion)", was originally recorded for Fay's 1971 album Time of the Last Persecution.

Reception

At Metacritic, which assigns a normalised rating out of 100 to reviews from mainstream critics, Who Is the Sender? received an average score of 76, based on 13 reviews, indicating "generally favorable reviews". AllMusic reviewer Thom Jurek said that the album contains "simple, profound songs" that "embrace the totality of earthly experience in the presence of the Divine". Dave Simpson of the Guardian called the album "beautifully hymnal" and said that "throughout, [Fay's] craft and enduring fascination with music itself is rather humbling." Pitchfork Medias Grayson Currin said that it "moves [Fay] from the category of a curiosity who returned after a four-decade absence to make a third great album to someone perhaps capable of doing so in perpetuity." In a review for the New York Times, Ben Ratliff said that Fay "means well" but that the album was "a trudge, and strangely ponderous in its smallness."

Track listing

References

External links
 Bill Fay, War Machine, video

Bill Fay albums
2015 albums
Dead Oceans albums